Bir Sarangwal is a village in Shaheed Bhagat Singh Nagar district of Punjab State, India. The village is administrated by Sarpanch an elected representative of the village.

Demography 
As of 2011, Bir Sarangwal has a total number of 18 houses and a population of 52 of which 31 include are males while 21 are females according to the report published by Census India in 2011. The literacy rate of Bir Sarangwal is 60.47%, higher than the state average of 75.84%. The population of children under the age of 6 years is 9 which is 17.31% of total population of Bir Sarangwal, and child sex ratio is approximately 1250 as compared to Punjab state average of 846.

Most of the people are from Schedule Caste in Bir Sarangwal. The town does not have any Schedule Tribe population so far.

As per the report published by Census India in 2011, 26 people were engaged in work activities out of the total population of Bir Sarangwal which includes 20 males and 6 females. According to census survey report 2011, 100% workers describe their work as main work and 0% workers are involved in Marginal activity providing livelihood for less than 6 months.

Education 
Amardeep Singh Shergill Memorial college Mukandpur and Sikh National College Banga are the nearest colleges.

List of schools nearby:
Sat Modern Public School, Mangat Dingrian
Guru Teg Bahadur Model School, Behram
Guru Ram Dass Public School, Cheta
Lovely Public School, Pathlawa

Transport 

See also 
List of villages in India

References

External links 
 Tourism of Punjab 
 Census of Punjab
 Locality Based PINCode

Villages in Shaheed Bhagat Singh Nagar district